God of Abraham (Yiddish: גאָט פֿון אַבֿרהם, pronounced Got fun Avrohom, Got fin Avruhom) is a Jewish prayer in Yiddish, recited by women and girls in many Jewish communities at the conclusion of the Sabbath, marking its conclusion (while the males are in the synagogue praying Maariv). In some Hasidic sects it is also recited by males before the Havdalah, (Havdole) service. It is erroneously attributed to Levi Yitzchok of Berditchev; it is found in old prayer books from before his time. It is the most common Yiddish prayer.

Text
The most common version reads as follows:

External links
Gott Fun Avraham in Yiddish with Vowel Points

Jewish prayer and ritual texts
Yiddish-language literature